Herbicides, also commonly known as weed killers, are substances used to control undesired plants, also known as weeds. Selective herbicides control specific weed species while leaving the desired crop relatively unharmed, while non-selective herbicides (sometimes called total weed killers in commercial products) can be used to clear waste ground, industrial and construction sites, railways and railway embankments as they kill all plant material with which they come into contact. Apart from selective/non-selective, other important distinctions include persistence (also known as residual action: how long the product stays in place and remains active), means of uptake (whether it is absorbed by above-ground foliage only, through the roots, or by other means), and mechanism of action (how it works). Historically, products such as common salt and other metal salts were used as herbicides, however, these have gradually fallen out of favor, and in some countries, a number of these are banned due to their persistence in soil, and toxicity and groundwater contamination concerns. Herbicides have also been used in warfare and conflict.

Modern herbicides are often synthetic mimics of natural plant hormones that interfere with the growth of the target plants. The term organic herbicide has come to mean herbicides intended for organic farming. Some plants also produce their own natural herbicides, such as the genus Juglans (walnuts), or the tree of heaven; such action of natural herbicides, and other related chemical interactions, is called allelopathy. Due to herbicide resistance – a major concern in agriculture – a number of products combine herbicides with different means of action. Integrated pest management may use herbicides alongside other pest control methods.

In the United States in 2012, about 91% of all herbicide usage, determined by weight applied, was in agriculture. In 2012, world pesticide expenditures totaled nearly $24.7 billion; herbicides were about 44% of those sales and constituted the biggest portion, followed by insecticides, fungicides, and fumigants. Herbicide is also used in forestry, where certain formulations have been found to suppress hardwood varieties in favor of conifers after clearcutting, as well as pasture systems, and management of areas set aside as wildlife habitat.

History
Prior to the widespread use of herbicides, cultural controls, such as altering soil pH, salinity, or fertility levels, were used to control weeds. Mechanical control (including tillage) was also (and still is) used to control weeds.

First herbicides

Although research into herbicides began in the early 20th century, the first major breakthrough was the result of research conducted in both the United Kingdom and the United States during the Second World War into the potential use of herbicides in war. The first modern herbicide, 2,4-D, was first discovered and synthesized by W. G. Templeman at Imperial Chemical Industries. In 1940, he showed that "Growth substances applied appropriately would kill certain broad-leaved weeds in cereals without harming the crops." By 1941, his team succeeded in synthesizing the chemical. In the same year, R. Pokorny in the US achieved this as well.

Independently, a team under Juda Hirsch Quastel, working at the Rothamsted Experimental Station made the same discovery. Quastel was tasked by the Agricultural Research Council (ARC) to discover methods for improving crop yield. By analyzing soil as a dynamic system, rather than an inert substance, he was able to apply techniques such as perfusion. Quastel was able to quantify the influence of various plant hormones, inhibitors, and other chemicals on the activity of microorganisms in the soil and assess their direct impact on plant growth. While the full work of the unit remained secret, certain discoveries were developed for commercial use after the war, including the 2,4-D compound.

When 2,4-D was commercially released in 1946, it triggered a worldwide revolution in agricultural output and became the first successful selective herbicide. It allowed for greatly enhanced weed control in wheat, maize (corn), rice, and similar cereal grass crops, because it kills dicots (broadleaf plants), but not most monocots (grasses). The low cost of 2,4-D has led to continued usage today, and it remains one of the most commonly used herbicides in the world. Like other acid herbicides, current formulations use either an amine salt (often trimethylamine) or one of many esters of the parent compound. These are easier to handle than the acid.

Further discoveries
The triazine family of herbicides, which includes atrazine, was introduced in the 1950s; they have the current distinction of being the herbicide family of greatest concern regarding groundwater contamination. Atrazine does not break down readily (within a few weeks) after being applied to soils of above-neutral pH. Under alkaline soil conditions, atrazine may be carried into the soil profile as far as the water table by soil water following rainfall causing the aforementioned contamination. Atrazine is thus said to have "carryover", a generally undesirable property for herbicides.

Glyphosate (Roundup) was introduced in 1974 for nonselective weed control. Following the development of glyphosate-resistant crop plants, it is now used very extensively for selective weed control in growing crops. The pairing of the herbicide with the resistant seed contributed to the consolidation of the seed and chemistry industry in the late 1990s.

Many modern herbicides used in agriculture and gardening are specifically formulated to decompose within a short period after application. This is desirable, as it allows crops and plants to be planted afterward, which could otherwise be affected by the herbicide. However, herbicides with low residual activity (i.e., that decompose quickly) often do not provide season-long weed control and do not ensure that weed roots are killed beneath construction and paving (and cannot emerge destructively in years to come), therefore there remains a role for weed killer with high levels of persistence in the soil.

Terminology
Herbicides are classified/grouped in various ways; for example, according to the activity, the timing of application, method of application, mechanism of action, and chemical family. This gives rise to a considerable level of terminology related to herbicides and their use.

Intended outcome
 Control is the destruction of unwanted weeds or the damage of them to the point where they are no longer competitive with the crop.
 Suppression is incomplete control and still provides some economic benefits, such as reduced competition with the crop.
 Crop safety, for selective herbicides, is the relative absence of damage or stress to the crop. Most selective herbicides cause some visible stress to crop plants.
 Defoliant, similar to herbicides, but designed to remove foliage (leaves) rather than kill the plant.

Selectivity (all plants or specific plants)
 The basis of selectivity is based on physical or biological factors. Some biological factors include morphology, physiology, metabolism, and biochemical factors.
There are some climatic factors affecting absorption including humidity, light, precipitation, and temperature. Foliar-applied herbicides will enter the leaf more readily at high humidity by lengthening the drying time of the spray droplet and increasing cuticle hydration. Light of high intensity may break down some herbicides and cause the leaf cuticle to thicken, which reduces absorption. Precipitation may wash away or remove some foliar-applied herbicides but it will increase root absorption of soil-applied herbicides. Drought-stressed plants are less likely to translocate herbicides. As temperature increases, herbicides' performance may decrease. Absorption and translocation may be reduced in very cold weather.
Selective herbicides control or suppress certain plants without affecting the growth of other plant species. Selectivity may be due to translocation, differential absorption, or physical (morphological),  or physiological differences between plant species. Surfactants alter the physical properties of the spray solution and the overall phytotoxicity of the herbicide, increasing translocation. 2,4-D, mecoprop, and dicamba control many broadleaf weeds but remain ineffective against turf grasses.
 Non-selective herbicides are not specific in acting against certain plant species and control all plant material with which they come into contact. They are used to clear industrial sites, waste grounds, railways, and railway embankments. Paraquat, glufosinate, and glyphosate are non-selective herbicides.

Timing of application
 Preplant: Preplant herbicides are nonselective herbicides applied to the soil before planting. Some preplant herbicides may be mechanically incorporated into the soil. The objective for incorporation is to prevent dissipation through photodecomposition and/or volatility. The herbicides kill weeds as they grow through the herbicide-treated zone. Volatile herbicides have to be incorporated into the soil before planting the pasture. Agricultural crops grown in soil treated with a preplant herbicide include tomatoes, corn, soybeans, and strawberries. Soil fumigants like metam-sodium and dazomet are in use as preplant herbicides.
 Preemergence: Preemergence herbicides are applied before the weed seedlings emerge through the soil surface. Herbicides do not prevent weeds from germinating but they kill weeds as they grow through the herbicide-treated zone by affecting the cell division in the emerging seedling. Dithiopyr and pendimethalin are preemergence herbicides. Weeds that have already emerged before application or activation are not affected by pre-herbicides as their primary growing point escapes the treatment.
 Postemergence: These herbicides are applied after weed seedlings have emerged through the soil surface. They can be foliar or root absorbed, selective or nonselective, and contact or systemic. Application of these herbicides is avoided during rain since being washed off the soil makes it ineffective. 2,4-D is a selective, systemic, foliar-absorbed postemergence herbicide.

Method of application
 Soil applied: Herbicides applied to the soil are usually taken up by the root or shoot of the emerging seedlings and are used as preplant or preemergence treatment. Several factors influence the effectiveness of soil-applied herbicides. Weeds absorb herbicides by both passive and active mechanisms. Herbicide adsorption to soil colloids or organic matter often reduces the amount available for weed absorption. Positioning of the herbicide in the correct layer of soil is very important, which can be achieved mechanically and by rainfall. Herbicides on the soil surface are subjected to several processes that reduce their availability. Volatility and photolysis are two common processes that reduce the availability of herbicides. Many soil-applied herbicides are absorbed through plant shoots while they are still underground leading to their death or injury. EPTC and trifluralin are soil-applied herbicides.
 Foliar applied: These are applied to a portion of the plant above the ground and are absorbed by exposed tissues. These are generally postemergence herbicides and can either be translocated (systemic) throughout the plant or remain at a specific site (contact). External barriers of plants like cuticles, waxes, cell walls etc. affect herbicide absorption and action. Glyphosate, 2,4-D, and dicamba are foliar-applied herbicides.

Persistence
 Residual activity: An herbicide is described as having low residual activity if it is neutralized within a short time of application (within a few weeks or months) – typically this is due to rainfall, or reactions in the soil. An herbicide described as having high residual activity will remain potent for the long term in the soil. For some compounds, the residual activity can leave the ground almost permanently barren.

Mechanism of action
Herbicides are often classified according to their site of action because as a general rule, herbicides within the same site of action class will produce similar symptoms on susceptible plants. Classification based on the site of action of the herbicide is preferable as herbicide resistance management can be handled more effectively. Classification by mechanism of action (MOA) indicates the first enzyme, protein, or biochemical step affected in the plant following application.

List of mechanisms found in modern herbicides
 ACCase inhibitors: Acetyl coenzyme A carboxylase (ACCase) is part of the first step of lipid synthesis. Thus, ACCase inhibitors affect cell membrane production in the meristems of the grass plant. The ACCases of grasses are sensitive to these herbicides, whereas the ACCases of dicot plants are not.
 ALS inhibitors: Acetolactate synthase (ALS; also known as acetohydroxyacid synthase, or AHAS) is part of the first step in the synthesis of the branched-chain amino acids (valine, leucine, and isoleucine). These herbicides slowly starve affected plants of these amino acids, which eventually leads to the inhibition of DNA synthesis. They affect grasses and dicots alike. The ALS inhibitor family includes various sulfonylureas (SUs) (such as flazasulfuron and metsulfuron-methyl), imidazolinones (IMIs), triazolopyrimidines (TPs), pyrimidinyl oxybenzoates (POBs), and sulfonylamino carbonyl triazolinones (SCTs). The ALS biological pathway exists only in plants and not animals, thus making the ALS-inhibitors among the safest herbicides.
 EPSPS inhibitors: Enolpyruvylshikimate 3-phosphate synthase enzyme (EPSPS) is used in the synthesis of the amino acids tryptophan, phenylalanine and tyrosine. They affect grasses and dicots alike. Glyphosate (Roundup) is a systemic EPSPS inhibitor inactivated by soil contact.
 Auxin-like herbicides: The discovery of synthetic auxins inaugurated the era of organic herbicides. They were discovered in the 1940s after a long study of the plant growth regulator auxin. Synthetic auxins mimic this plant hormone in some way. They have several points of action on the cell membrane, and are effective in the control of dicot plants. 2,4-D, 2,4,5-T, and Aminopyralid are examples of synthetic auxin herbicides.
 Photosystem II inhibitors reduce electron flow from water to NADP+ at the photochemical step in photosynthesis. They bind to the Qb site on the D1 protein, and prevent quinone from binding to this site. Therefore, this group of compounds causes electrons to accumulate on chlorophyll molecules. As a consequence, oxidation reactions in excess of those normally tolerated by the cell occur, and the plant dies. The triazine herbicides (including atrazine) and urea derivatives (diuron) are photosystem II inhibitors.
 Photosystem I inhibitors steal electrons from ferredoxins, specifically the normal pathway through FeS to Fdx to NADP+, leading to direct discharge of electrons on oxygen. As a result, reactive oxygen species are produced and oxidation reactions in excess of those normally tolerated by the cell occur, leading to plant death. Bipyridinium herbicides (such as diquat and paraquat) inhibit the FeS to Fdx step of that chain, while diphenyl ether herbicides (such as nitrofen, nitrofluorfen, and acifluorfen) inhibit the Fdx to NADP+ step.
 HPPD inhibitors inhibit 4-hydroxyphenylpyruvate dioxygenase, which are involved in tyrosine breakdown. Tyrosine breakdown products are used by plants to make carotenoids, which protect chlorophyll in plants from being destroyed by sunlight. If this happens, the plants turn white due to complete loss of chlorophyll, and the plants die. Mesotrione and sulcotrione are herbicides in this class; a drug, nitisinone, was discovered in the course of developing this class of herbicides.

Herbicide group (labeling)
One of the most important methods for preventing, delaying, or managing resistance is to reduce the reliance on a single herbicide mode of action. To do this, farmers must know the mode of action for the herbicides they intend to use, but the relatively complex nature of plant biochemistry makes this difficult to determine. Attempts were made to simplify the understanding of herbicide mode of action by developing a classification system that grouped herbicides by mode of action. Eventually the Herbicide Resistance Action Committee (HRAC) and the Weed Science Society of America (WSSA) developed a classification system. The WSSA and HRAC systems differ in the group designation. Groups in the WSSA and the HRAC systems are designated by numbers and letters, respectively. The goal for adding the “Group” classification and mode of action to the herbicide product label is to provide a simple and practical approach to deliver the information to users. This information will make it easier to develop educational material that is consistent and effective. It should increase user's awareness of herbicide mode of action and provide more accurate recommendations for resistance management. Another goal is to make it easier for users to keep records on which herbicide mode of actions are being used on a particular field from year to year.

Chemical family
Detailed investigations on the chemical structure of active ingredients of the registered herbicides showed that some moieties (moiety is a part of a molecule that may include either whole functional groups or parts of functional groups as substructures; a functional group has similar chemical properties whenever it occurs in different compounds) have the same mechanisms of action. According to Forouzesh et al. 2015, these moieties have been assigned to the names of chemical families and active ingredients are then classified within the chemical families accordingly. Knowing about herbicide chemical family grouping could serve as a short-term strategy for managing resistance to site of action.

Use and application

Most herbicides are applied as water-based sprays using ground equipment. Towed, handheld, and even horse-drawn sprayers are also used. On large areas, herbicides may also at times be applied aerially using helicopters or airplanes, or through irrigation systems (known as chemigation).

A further method of herbicide application developed around 2010, involves ridding the soil of its active weed seed bank rather than just killing the weed. This can successfully treat annual plants but not perennials. Researchers at the Agricultural Research Service found that the application of herbicides to fields late in the weeds' growing season greatly reduces their seed production, and therefore fewer weeds will return the following season. Because most weeds are annuals, their seeds will only survive in soil for a year or two, so this method will be able to destroy such weeds after a few years of herbicide application.

Weed-wiping may also be used, where a wick wetted with herbicide is suspended from a boom and dragged or rolled across the tops of the taller weed plants. This allows treatment of taller grassland weeds by direct contact without affecting related but desirable shorter plants in the grassland sward beneath. The method has the benefit of avoiding spray drift. In Wales, a scheme offering free weed-wiper hire was launched in 2015 in an effort to reduce the levels of MCPA in water courses.

There is little difference in forestry in the early growth stages, when the height similarities between growing trees and growing annual crops yields a similar problem with weed competition. Unlike with annuals however, application is mostly unnecessary thereafter and is thus mostly used to decrease the delay between productive economic cycles of lumber crops.

Misuse and misapplication

Herbicide volatilisation or spray drift may result in herbicide affecting neighboring fields or plants, particularly in windy conditions. Sometimes, the wrong field or plants may be sprayed due to error.

Use politically, militarily, and in conflict 

Although herbicidal warfare uses chemical substances, its main purpose is to disrupt agricultural food production and/or to destroy plants which provide cover or concealment to the enemy. During the Malayan Emergency (1948–1960), the British military deployed herbicides and defoliants in the Malaysian countryside (including crop fields) in order to deprive Malayan National Liberation Army (MNLA) insurgents of cover, potential sources of food and to flush them out of the jungle. Deployment of herbicides and defoliants served the dual purpose of thinning jungle trails to prevent ambushes and destroying crop fields in regions where the MNLA was active to deprive them of potential sources of food. Herbicides and defoliants were also sprayed from Royal Air Force (RAF) aircraft. The use of herbicides as a chemical weapon by the U.S. military during the Vietnam War has left tangible, long-term impacts upon the Vietnamese people and U.S soldiers that handled the chemicals. More than 20% of South Vietnam's forests, and 3.2% of its cultivated land were sprayed at least once between during the war. The government of Vietnam says that up to four million people in Vietnam were exposed to the defoliant, and as many as three million people have suffered illness because of Agent Orange, while the Red Cross of Vietnam estimates that up to one million people were disabled or have health problems as a result of exposure to Agent Orange. The United States government has described these figures as unreliable.

Health and environmental effects

Herbicides have widely variable toxicity in addition to acute toxicity arising from ingestion of a significant quantity rapidly, and chronic toxicity arising from environmental and occupational exposure over long periods. Much public suspicion of herbicides revolves around a confusion between valid statements of acute toxicity as opposed to equally valid statements of lack of chronic toxicity at the recommended levels of usage. For instance, while glyphosate formulations with tallowamine adjuvants are acutely toxic, their use was found to be uncorrelated with any health issues like cancer in a massive US Department of Health study on 90,000 members of farmer families for over a period of 23 years. That is, the study shows lack of chronic toxicity, but cannot question the herbicide's acute toxicity.

Some herbicides cause a range of health effects ranging from skin rashes to death. The pathway of attack can arise from intentional or unintentional direct consumption, improper application resulting in the herbicide coming into direct contact with people or wildlife, inhalation of aerial sprays, or food consumption prior to the labelled preharvest interval. Under some conditions, certain herbicides can be transported via leaching or surface runoff to contaminate groundwater or distant surface water sources. Generally, the conditions that promote herbicide transport include intense storm events (particularly shortly after application) and soils with limited capacity to adsorb or retain the herbicides. Herbicide properties that increase likelihood of transport include persistence (resistance to degradation) and high water solubility.

Phenoxy herbicides are often contaminated with dioxins such as TCDD; research has suggested such contamination results in a small rise in cancer risk after occupational exposure to these herbicides. Triazine exposure has been implicated in a likely relationship to increased risk of breast cancer, although a causal relationship remains unclear.

Herbicide manufacturers have at times made false or misleading claims about the safety of their products. Chemical manufacturer Monsanto Company agreed to change its advertising after pressure from New York attorney general Dennis Vacco; Vacco complained about misleading claims that its spray-on glyphosate-based herbicides, including Roundup, were safer than table salt and "practically non-toxic" to mammals, birds, and fish (though proof that this was ever said is hard to find). Roundup is toxic and has resulted in death after being ingested in quantities ranging from 85 to 200 ml, although it has also been ingested in quantities as large as 500 ml with only mild or moderate symptoms. The manufacturer of Tordon 101 (Dow AgroSciences, owned by the Dow Chemical Company) has claimed Tordon 101 has no effects on animals and insects, in spite of evidence of strong carcinogenic activity of the active ingredient, picloram, in studies on rats.

The risk of Parkinson's disease has been shown to increase with occupational exposure to herbicides and pesticides. The herbicide paraquat is suspected to be one such factor.

All commercially sold, organic and non-organic herbicides must be extensively tested prior to approval for sale and labeling by the Environmental Protection Agency. However, because of the large number of herbicides in use, concern regarding health effects is significant. In addition to health effects caused by herbicides themselves, commercial herbicide mixtures often contain other chemicals, including inactive ingredients, which have negative impacts on human health.

Ecological effects
Commercial herbicide use generally has negative impacts on bird populations, although the impacts are highly variable and often require field studies to predict accurately. Laboratory studies have at times overestimated negative impacts on birds due to toxicity, predicting serious problems that were not observed in the field. Most observed effects are due not to toxicity, but to habitat changes and the decreases in abundance of species on which birds rely for food or shelter. Herbicide use in silviculture, used to favor certain types of growth following clearcutting, can cause significant drops in bird populations. Even when herbicides which have low toxicity to birds are used, they decrease the abundance of many types of vegetation on which the birds rely. Herbicide use in agriculture in the UK has been linked to a decline in seed-eating bird species which rely on the weeds killed by the herbicides. Heavy use of herbicides in neotropical agricultural areas has been one of many factors implicated in limiting the usefulness of such agricultural land for wintering migratory birds.

Frog populations may be affected negatively by the use of herbicides as well. While some studies have shown that atrazine may be a teratogen, causing demasculinization in male frogs, the EPA and its independent Scientific Advisory Panel (SAP) examined all available studies on this topic and concluded that "atrazine does not adversely affect amphibian gonadal development based on a review of laboratory and field studies."

Scientific uncertainty of full extent of herbicide effects
The health and environmental effects of many herbicides is unknown, and even the scientific community often disagrees on the risk. For example, a 1995 panel of 13 scientists reviewing studies on the carcinogenicity of 2,4-D had divided opinions on the likelihood 2,4-D causes cancer in humans. , studies on phenoxy herbicides were too few to accurately assess the risk of many types of cancer from these herbicides, even though evidence was stronger that exposure to these herbicides is associated with increased risk of soft tissue sarcoma and non-Hodgkin lymphoma. Furthermore, there is some suggestion that herbicides, as atrazine, can play a role in sex reversal of certain organisms that experience temperature-dependent sex determination, which could theoretically alter sex ratios.

Resistance 
Weed resistance to herbicides has become a major concern in crop production worldwide. Resistance to herbicides is often attributed to lack of rotational programmes of herbicides and to continuous applications of herbicides with the same sites of action. Thus, a true understanding of the sites of action of herbicides is essential for strategic planning of herbicide-based weed control.

Plants have developed resistance to atrazine and to ALS-inhibitors, and more recently, to glyphosate herbicides. Marestail is one weed that has developed glyphosate resistance. Glyphosate-resistant weeds are present in the vast majority of soybean, cotton and corn farms in some U.S. states. Weeds that can resist multiple other herbicides are spreading. Few new herbicides are near commercialization, and none with a molecular mode of action for which there is no resistance. Because most herbicides could not kill all weeds, farmers rotate crops and herbicides to stop the development of resistant weeds. During its initial years, glyphosate was not subject to resistance and allowed farmers to reduce the use of rotation.

A family of weeds that includes waterhemp (Amaranthus rudis) is the largest concern. A 2008–2009 survey of 144 populations of waterhemp in 41 Missouri counties revealed glyphosate resistance in 69%. Weeds from some 500 sites throughout Iowa in 2011 and 2012 revealed glyphosate resistance in approximately 64% of waterhemp samples. The use of other killers to target "residual" weeds has become common, and may be sufficient to have stopped the spread of resistance From 2005 through 2010 researchers discovered 13 different weed species that had developed resistance to glyphosate. But since then only two more have been discovered. Weeds resistant to multiple herbicides with completely different biological action modes are on the rise. In Missouri, 43% of samples were resistant to two different herbicides; 6% resisted three; and 0.5% resisted four. In Iowa 89% of waterhemp samples resist two or more herbicides, 25% resist three, and 10% resist five.

For southern cotton, herbicide costs has climbed from between $50 and $75 per hectare a few years ago to about $370 per hectare in 2013. Resistance is contributing to a massive shift away from growing cotton; over the past few years, the area planted with cotton has declined by 70% in Arkansas and by 60% in Tennessee. For soybeans in Illinois, costs have risen from about $25 to $160 per hectare.

As of 2013, Dow AgroSciences, Bayer CropScience, Syngenta, and Monsanto were all developing seed varieties resistant to herbicides other than glyphosate, which will make it easier for farmers to use alternative weed killers. Even though weeds have already evolved some resistance to those herbicides, Powles says the new seed-and-herbicide combos should work well if used with proper rotation.

Biochemistry of resistance
Resistance to herbicides can be based on one of the following biochemical mechanisms: 
 Target-site resistance: This is due to a reduced (or even lost) ability of the herbicide to bind to its target protein. The effect usually relates to an enzyme with a crucial function in a metabolic pathway, or to a component of an electron-transport system. Target-site resistance may also be caused by an over-expression of the target enzyme (via gene amplification or changes in a gene promoter).
 Non-target-site resistance: This is caused by mechanisms that reduce the amount of herbicidal active compound reaching the target site. One important mechanism is an enhanced metabolic detoxification of the herbicide in the weed, which leads to insufficient amounts of the active substance reaching the target site. A reduced uptake and translocation, or sequestration of the herbicide, may also result in an insufficient herbicide transport to the target site.
 Cross-resistance: In this case, a single resistance mechanism causes resistance to several herbicides. The term target-site cross-resistance is used when the herbicides bind to the same target site, whereas non-target-site cross-resistance is due to a single non-target-site mechanism (e.g., enhanced metabolic detoxification) that entails resistance across herbicides with different sites of action.
 Multiple resistance: In this situation, two or more resistance mechanisms are present within individual plants, or within a plant population.

Resistance management
Worldwide experience has been that farmers tend to do little to prevent herbicide resistance developing, and only take action when it is a problem on their own farm or neighbor's. Careful observation is important so that any reduction in herbicide efficacy can be detected. This may indicate evolving resistance. It is vital that resistance is detected at an early stage as if it becomes an acute, whole-farm problem, options are more limited and greater expense is almost inevitable. Table 1 lists factors which enable the risk of resistance to be assessed. An essential pre-requisite for confirmation of resistance is a good diagnostic test. Ideally this should be rapid, accurate, cheap and accessible. Many diagnostic tests have been developed, including glasshouse pot assays, petri dish assays and chlorophyll fluorescence. A key component of such tests is that the response of the suspect population to a herbicide can be compared with that of known susceptible and resistant standards under controlled conditions. Most cases of herbicide resistance are a consequence of the repeated use of herbicides, often in association with crop monoculture and reduced cultivation practices. It is necessary, therefore, to modify these practices in order to prevent or delay the onset of resistance or to control existing resistant populations. A key objective should be the reduction in selection pressure. An integrated weed management (IWM) approach is required, in which as many tactics as possible are used to combat weeds. In this way, less reliance is placed on herbicides and so selection pressure should be reduced.

Optimising herbicide input to the economic threshold level should avoid the unnecessary use of herbicides and reduce selection pressure. Herbicides should be used to their greatest potential by ensuring that the timing, dose, application method, soil and climatic conditions are optimal for good activity. In the UK, partially resistant grass weeds such as Alopecurus myosuroides (blackgrass) and Avena genus (wild oat) can often be controlled adequately when herbicides are applied at the 2-3 leaf stage, whereas later applications at the 2-3 tiller stage can fail badly. Patch spraying, or applying herbicide to only the badly infested areas of fields, is another means of reducing total herbicide use.

Approaches to treating resistant weeds

Alternative herbicides
When resistance is first suspected or confirmed, the efficacy of alternatives is likely to be the first consideration. The use of alternative herbicides which remain effective on resistant populations can be a successful strategy, at least in the short term. The effectiveness of alternative herbicides will be highly dependent on the extent of cross-resistance. If there is resistance to a single group of herbicides, then the use of herbicides from other groups may provide a simple and effective solution, at least in the short term. For example, many triazine-resistant weeds have been readily controlled by the use of alternative herbicides such as dicamba or glyphosate. If resistance extends to more than one herbicide group, then choices are more limited. It should not be assumed that resistance will automatically extend to all herbicides with the same mode of action, although it is wise to assume this until proved otherwise. In many weeds the degree of cross-resistance between the five groups of ALS inhibitors varies considerably. Much will depend on the resistance mechanisms present, and it should not be assumed that these will necessarily be the same in different populations of the same species. These differences are due, at least in part, to the existence of different mutations conferring target site resistance. Consequently, selection for different mutations may result in different patterns of cross-resistance. Enhanced metabolism can affect even closely related herbicides to differing degrees. For example, populations of Alopecurus myosuroides (blackgrass) with an enhanced metabolism mechanism show resistance to pendimethalin but not to trifluralin, despite both being dinitroanilines. This is due to differences in the vulnerability of these two herbicides to oxidative metabolism. Consequently, care is needed when trying to predict the efficacy of alternative herbicides.

Mixtures and sequences
The use of two or more herbicides which have differing modes of action can reduce the selection for resistant genotypes. Ideally, each component in a mixture should:
 Be active at different target sites
 Have a high level of efficacy
 Be detoxified by different biochemical pathways
 Have similar persistence in the soil (if it is a residual herbicide)
 Exert negative cross-resistance
 Synergise the activity of the other component
No mixture is likely to have all these attributes, but the first two listed are the most important. There is a risk that mixtures will select for resistance to both components in the longer term. One practical advantage of sequences of two herbicides compared with mixtures is that a better appraisal of the efficacy of each herbicide component is possible, provided that sufficient time elapses between each application. A disadvantage with sequences is that two separate applications have to be made and it is possible that the later application will be less effective on weeds surviving the first application. If these are resistant, then the second herbicide in the sequence may increase selection for resistant individuals by killing the susceptible plants which were damaged but not killed by the first application, but allowing the larger, less affected, resistant plants to survive. This has been cited as one reason why ALS-resistant Stellaria media has evolved in Scotland recently (2000), despite the regular use of a sequence incorporating mecoprop, a herbicide with a different mode of action.

Herbicide rotations
Rotation of herbicides from different chemical groups in successive years should reduce selection for resistance. This is a key element in most resistance prevention programmes. The value of this approach depends on the extent of cross-resistance, and whether multiple resistance occurs owing to the presence of several different resistance mechanisms. A practical problem can be the lack of awareness by farmers of the different groups of herbicides that exist. In Australia a scheme has been introduced in which identifying letters are included on the product label as a means of enabling farmers to distinguish products with different modes of action.

Farming practices and resistance: a case study 
Herbicide resistance became a critical problem in Australian agriculture, after many Australian sheep farmers began to exclusively grow wheat in their pastures in the 1970s. Introduced varieties of ryegrass, while good for grazing sheep, compete intensely with wheat. Ryegrasses produce so many seeds that, if left unchecked, they can completely choke a field. Herbicides provided excellent control, while reducing soil disrupting because of less need to plough. Within little more than a decade, ryegrass and other weeds began to develop resistance. In response Australian farmers changed methods. By 1983, patches of ryegrass had become immune to Hoegrass, a family of herbicides that inhibit an enzyme called acetyl coenzyme A carboxylase.

Ryegrass populations were large, and had substantial genetic diversity, because farmers had planted many varieties. Ryegrass is cross-pollinated by wind, so genes shuffle frequently. To control its distribution farmers sprayed inexpensive Hoegrass, creating selection pressure. In addition, farmers sometimes diluted the herbicide in order to save money, which allowed some plants to survive application. When resistance appeared farmers turned to a group of herbicides that block acetolactate synthase. Once again, ryegrass in Australia evolved a kind of "cross-resistance" that allowed it to rapidly break down a variety of herbicides. Four classes of herbicides become ineffective within a few years. In 2013 only two herbicide classes, called Photosystem II and long-chain fatty acid inhibitors, were effective against ryegrass.

List of common herbicides

Chemical herbicides types
 2,4-D (2,4-dichlorophenoxy acetic acid)is a broadleaf herbicide in the phenoxy group used in turf and no-till field crop production. Now, it is mainly used in a blend with other herbicides to allow lower rates of herbicides to be used; it is the most widely used herbicide in the world, and third most commonly used in the United States. It is an example of synthetic auxin (plant hormone).
 Aminopyralid is a broadleaf herbicide in the pyridine group, used to control weeds on grassland, such as docks, thistles and nettles. It is notorious for its ability to persist in compost.
 Atrazine, a triazine herbicide, is used in corn and sorghum for control of broadleaf weeds and grasses. Still used because of its low cost and because it works well on a broad spectrum of weeds common in the US corn belt, atrazine is commonly used with other herbicides to reduce the overall rate of atrazine and to lower the potential for groundwater contamination; it is a photosystem II inhibitor.
 Clopyralid is a broadleaf herbicide in the pyridine group, used mainly in turf, rangeland, and for control of noxious thistles. Notorious for its ability to persist in compost, it is another example of synthetic auxin.
 Dicamba, a postemergent broadleaf herbicide with some soil activity, is used on turf and field corn. It is another example of a synthetic auxin.
 Glufosinate ammonium, a broad-spectrum contact herbicide, is used to control weeds after the crop emerges or for total vegetation control on land not used for cultivation.
 Fluazifop (Fuselade Forte), a post emergence, foliar absorbed, translocated grass-selective herbicide with little residual action. It is used on a very wide range of broad leaved crops for control of annual and perennial grasses.
 Fluroxypyr, a systemic, selective herbicide, is used for the control of broad-leaved weeds in small grain cereals, maize, pastures, rangeland and turf. It is a synthetic auxin. In cereal growing, fluroxypyr's key importance is control of cleavers, Galium aparine. Other key broadleaf weeds are also controlled.
 Glyphosate, a systemic nonselective herbicide, is used in no-till burndown and for weed control in crops genetically modified to resist its effects. It is an example of an EPSPs inhibitor.
 Imazapyr a nonselective herbicide, is used for the control of a broad range of weeds, including terrestrial annual and perennial grasses and broadleaf herbs, woody species, and riparian and emergent aquatic species.
 Imazapic, a selective herbicide for both the pre- and postemergent control of some annual and perennial grasses and some broadleaf weeds, kills plants by inhibiting the production of branched chain amino acids (valine, leucine, and isoleucine), which are necessary for protein synthesis and cell growth.
 Imazamox, an imidazolinone manufactured by BASF for postemergence application that is an acetolactate synthase (ALS) inhibitor. Sold under trade names Raptor, Beyond, and Clearcast.
 Linuron is a nonselective herbicide used in the control of grasses and broadleaf weeds. It works by inhibiting photosynthesis.
 MCPA (2-methyl-4-chlorophenoxyacetic acid) is a phenoxy herbicide selective for broadleaf plants and widely used in cereals and pasture.
 Metolachlor is a pre-emergent herbicide widely used for control of annual grasses in corn and sorghum; it has displaced some of the atrazine in these uses.
 Metam is an organosulfur compound (formally a dithiocarbamate), which is used as a soil fumigant, pesticide, herbicide, and fungicide. It is one of the most widely used pesticides in the United States, with approximately 60 million pounds used in 2001.
 Paraquat is a nonselective contact herbicide used for no-till burndown and in aerial destruction of marijuana and coca plantings. It is more acutely toxic to people than any other herbicide in widespread commercial use.
 Pendimethalin, a pre-emergent herbicide, is widely used to control annual grasses and some broad-leaf weeds in a wide range of crops, including corn, soybeans, wheat, cotton, many tree and vine crops, and many turfgrass species.
 Picloram, a pyridine herbicide, mainly is used to control unwanted trees in pastures and edges of fields. It is another synthetic auxin.
 Sodium chlorate (disused/banned in some countries), a nonselective herbicide, is considered phytotoxic to all green plant parts. It can also kill through root absorption.
 Triclopyr, a systemic, foliar herbicide in the pyridine group, is used to control broadleaf weeds while leaving grasses and conifers unaffected.
 Several sulfonylureas, including Flazasulfuron and Metsulfuron-methyl, which act as ALS inhibitors and in some cases are taken up from the soil via the roots.

Organic herbicides
Recently, the term "organic" has come to imply products used in organic farming. Under this definition, an organic herbicide is one that can be used in a farming enterprise that has been classified as organic. Depending on the application, they may be less effective than synthetic herbicides and are generally used along with cultural and mechanical weed control practices.

Homemade organic herbicides include:
 Corn gluten meal (CGM) is a natural pre-emergence weed control used in turfgrass, which reduces germination of many broadleaf and grass weeds.
 Vinegar is effective for 5–20% solutions of acetic acid, with higher concentrations most effective, but it mainly destroys surface growth, so respraying to treat regrowth is needed. Resistant plants generally succumb when weakened by respraying.
 Steam has been applied commercially, but is now considered uneconomical and inadequate. It controls surface growth but not underground growth and so respraying to treat regrowth of perennials is needed.
 Flame is considered more effective than steam, but suffers from the same difficulties.
 D-limonene (citrus oil) is a natural degreasing agent that strips the waxy skin or cuticle from weeds, causing dehydration and ultimately death.
 Saltwater or salt applied in appropriate strengths to the rootzone will kill most plants.

Of historical interest and other

 2,4,5-Trichlorophenoxyacetic acid (2,4,5-T) was a widely used broadleaf herbicide until being phased out starting in the late 1970s. While 2,4,5-T itself is of only moderate toxicity, the manufacturing process for 2,4,5-T contaminates this chemical with trace amounts of 2,3,7,8-tetrachlorodibenzo-p-dioxin (TCDD). TCDD is extremely toxic to humans. With proper temperature control during production of 2,4,5-T, TCDD levels can be held to about .005 ppm. Before the TCDD risk was well understood, early production facilities lacked proper temperature controls. Individual batches tested later were found to have as much as 60 ppm of TCDD. 2,4,5-T was withdrawn from use in the US in 1983, at a time of heightened public sensitivity about chemical hazards in the environment. Public concern about dioxins was high, and production and use of other (non-herbicide) chemicals potentially containing TCDD contamination was also withdrawn. These included pentachlorophenol (a wood preservative) and PCBs (mainly used as stabilizing agents in transformer oil). 2,4,5-T has since largely been replaced by dicamba and triclopyr.
 Agent Orange was a herbicide blend used by the British military during the Malayan Emergency and the U.S. military during the Vietnam War between January 1965 and April 1970 as a defoliant. It was a 50/50 mixture of the n-butyl esters of 2,4,5-T and 2,4-D. Because of TCDD contamination in the 2,4,5-T component, it has been blamed for serious illnesses in many people who were exposed to it.
 Diesel, and other heavy oil derivatives, are known to be informally used at times, but are usually banned for this purpose.

See also

 Bioherbicide
 Environmental impact assessment
 Index of pesticide articles
 Integrated pest management
 List of environmental health hazards
 Preemergent herbicide
 Rainbow herbicides and Herbicidal warfare
 Soil contamination
 Surface runoff
 Weed
 Weed control
 Defoliant

References

Further reading
 A Brief History of On-track Weed Control in the N.S.W. SRA during the Steam Era Longworth, Jim Australian Railway Historical Society Bulletin, April, 1996 pp99–116

External links

General Information
 National Pesticide Information Center, Information about pesticide-related topics
 National Agricultural Statistics Service

Regulatory policy
 US EPA
 UK Pesticides Safety Directorate
 European Commission pesticide information
 pmra Pest Management Regulatory Agency of Canada

 
Pesticides
Soil contamination
Lawn care
Toxicology
Biocides
Chemical anti-agriculture weapons